Palazzo Versace may refer to:

Palazzo Versace Dubai, hotel in Culture Village, Dubai
Palazzo Versace Australia, hotel on the Gold Coast, Queensland, Australia